Safet Plakalo (4 March 1950 – 19 March 2015) was a prominent  Bosnian playwright, journalist, theatre critic and a founder of Sarajevo War Theatre (SARTR). He was one of the few South Slavic writers of poetic dramatic orientation. His unique dramatic expression integrated the precise poetic form of a sonnet deeply into a dramatic form.

Having written his first play, Vrh (The Peak), at the age of 26, he held the honour of being the youngest playwright in the theatrical history of Bosnia and Herzegovina whose play was staged by a professional theatre. The success of Vrh had secured him his first commission to write a play about the 1941 anti-fascist insurgence in the Romanija region near Sarajevo. Though one of his best plays, Iza šutnjes (Beyond Silence) attempt to demystify the legend of Slaviša Vajner Čiča, a Partisan leader at the heart of the events, displeased Bosnian political censors. As a result, the play was swiftly taken off the repertoires of the four out of five leading Bosnian theatres. The fifth one, in Banja Luka, never attempted to stage it.

Plakalo wrote his third play Nit in the middle of the censorship battle, but disheartened by the outcome and the "incomprehensible attitude of the Bosnian theatrical world towards home-grown dramatic literature", he temporarily gave up on writing to become a theatre critic. By the end of the third decade of his life, while his daughter was still a girl, Plakalo, however, wrote three radio-plays, all three of them (Koncert za klavir i svjetlost, Preparirano proljeće and Balada o Modrinji), for children.

His doubt, however, didn't leave him and it was only at the request of his great friend and the doyen of the Bosnian theatre, actor Safet Pašalić, that he agreed to write Kulin IV (Kulin the Fourth). As destiny would have it, the great actor died not long after the work's completion, and Plakalo decided not to follow through with the production. It was a personal tragedy that made him return to his dramatic and poetic roots with an autobiographical memento mori to his killed wife, Sonja, Phoenix je sagorio uzalud (Phoenix Has Burnt In Vain). On his 36th birthday, and ten years after his first play, he finally saw another of his works premiered on a theatre stage.

What followed was his most significant drama to date, Lutkino bespuće (A Doll's Wasteland), Plakalo's 'reply' to Henrik Ibsen's A Doll's House (Nora). Lutkino bespuće earned Plakalo a reputation as the 'Ibsen of Bosnia' both at home and abroad. The play caught the eye of the Columbia University Ibsenologist, Professor Sandra Saari, and Norway's Ibsen Stage Festival, but another twist of fate put Plakalo's international plans on hold as his beloved Sarajevo came under siege in 1992.

Theatre against death

In the city paralyzed by war, Plakalo and three of his close friends and collaborators, Gradimir Gojer, Đorđe Mačkić and Dubravko Bibanović, decided to form Sarajevo War Theatre (SARTR) as a form of spiritual resistance to the madness of war. Together with Bibanović, Plakalo embarks on writing Sarajevo's first authentic war play - Sklonište (The Shelter), in which he explored the genre of grotesque as the only meaningful approach to the tragedy that surrounded them. During the next 12 months, Sarajevans braved shelling, snipers and hunger to see Sklonište 97 times, often under candlelight. The theatre's ensemble did the same for its audience taking the performance to the front-line on more than one occasion, and giving some 2000 performances during Sarajevo's four years under siege.

In 1994, at the height of the siege, Plakalo wrote a letter to his friend Stein Wing, director of the National Theatre of Norway, and with support from Waclav Havel, Ingmar Bergman, Ellen Horn and Bibi Andersson, the troupe made its way through Sarajevo's only lifeline, the famous Tunnel, to make its first international appearance at the Ibsen Stage Festival in Oslo. Since then, SARTR has made over a hundred appearances around Europe, and collaborated widely, most notably with the Valencian dramatist José Sanchís Sinisterra, Moscow’s Hudojestveni Theatre director Nikolay Skorik, Bordeaux's Globe Theatre, and the Ex-ponto International Festival in Slovenia.

The Memoirs of Mina Hauzen, another Plakalo's play, was SARTR's first post-war production. However, despite their immense popularity, neither Sklonište, nor The Memoirs had a lasting effect on Plakalo's dramatic orientation. As the world around him returned to an uneasy peace, Plakalo returned to his primary interest - the theatre of human intimacy, penning an hommage to his mother in a play about Prophet Muhammad's daughter, Fatima. The most complex of his plays, Hazreti Fatima (Fatima Az-Sahra), marks Plakalo's return to another interest - poetic drama, demonstrating his T. S. Eliot-inspired need to address the reader in a strict poetic form with rare erudition and piety. His fascination with the fundamental philosophical issues of women's existence soon found another expression in the play Smrt i čežnja Silvije Plat (The Death and Desire of Sylvia Plath), another hommage, this time to the great American poet.

Plakalo was also the spiritus movens behind the famous 1969 Poetic Marathon, a former journalist of Oslobodjenje, Večernje novine, and Sarajevo's city radio "202", and a respected theatre critic. He died in Sarajevo on March 19, 2015, after a long illness, and was posthumously awarded the Sarajevo Canton Plaque for his contribution to arts and culture. His first and only novel, “Plod smrti” has not been published.

Bibliography

Plays, radio-plays and librettos 
Vrh (The Peak), 1976.
Iza šutnje (Beyond Silence), 1977.
Nit (In vino veritas) (The Thread), 1982.
Koncert za klavir i svjetlost (The Concerto for Piano and Light), 1977.
Preparirano proljeće (The Stuffed Springtime), 1979.
Balada o Modrinji (A Ballad about Modrinja), 1980.
Phoenix je sagorio uzalud (Phoenix has burnt in vain), 1984.
Kulin IV (Kulin the Fourth)
Balada o ex-šampionu (A Ballad about an Ex-champion), 1985.
Lutkino bespuće (A Doll's Wasteland), 1990.
Sklonište (The Shelter), 1992.
Memoari Mine Hauzen (The Memoirs of Mina Houzen), 1995.
Hazreti Fatima (Fatima Az-Sahra), 1998.
Omer za naćvama, libretto based on a play by Alija Nametak, 1999.
Soba od vizije (Chambre des Visions) (A Room of Vision)
Čežnja i smrt Silvije Plat (Désir et mort de Sylvia Plath) (The Death and Desire of Sylvia Plath)
U traganju za bojom kestena (In search of the colour of chestnut), 2002.
 “Kraljice” (Queens), 2003. - the author of songs

Novels
Plod smrti, forthcoming

Poetry
”Sabrane pjesme” (The poetry collection), 2004.

Articles and publications
MAK, 1917-1997

Others about Safet Plakalo
Muhamed Dzelilovic, “Fenix (ni)je sagorio uzalud), 2015
Nada Salom, “SARTR: Pozorisno biti ili ne biti"
Kenan Beslija, “Covjek zvani teatar”

Aleksandra Bilic, “Theatre and Performance as a means of survival and resistance during the Siege of Sarajevo"

References

Knežević, Maja, "A letter about the author" in Plakalo, Safet, Hazreti Fatima'''Vujanović, Vojislav'', Review, Bilten Pozorišnih Igara u Brčkom, 7 November 2004

1950 births
2015 deaths
Bosniaks of Bosnia and Herzegovina
Bosnia and Herzegovina Muslims
Bosnia and Herzegovina dramatists and playwrights
Bosniak writers
Bosniak poets
20th-century poets
20th-century dramatists and playwrights
20th-century Bosnia and Herzegovina people
21st-century Bosnia and Herzegovina people
20th-century Bosnia and Herzegovina writers
21st-century Bosnia and Herzegovina writers